San Pancrazio ("St. Pancras") is a 9th- or 10th-century church and former pieve in Sestino, Tuscany dedicated to St. Pancras of Rome.

It is built over a Roman Curia Augusta or ancient Roman court building. Of the original medieval edifice the crypt survives, with walls decorated by blind arches and columns and medieval  sculptures. The Romanesque apse is from the 12th century, while the façade was remade in the late 17th century and the two aisles were suppressed in 1784. Notable is also the sandstone altar (1259) supported by a Roman cippus (374).

References

Churches in the province of Arezzo
Pancrazio
Pancrazio